Randy Sabien (born September 26, 1956) is an American jazz violinist, composer, and music educator known for his live performances and numerous recordings, many of them on Flying Fish Records and Red House Records. At the age of 21 he founded and chaired the Jazz Strings department at Boston's Berklee College of Music and since 2009 has been the chair of the Strings department of McNally Smith College of Music.

Life and career 

Sabien was born in North Carolina while his father was in the US Army as a dentist.  After his tour of duty, the family settled in Rockford, Illinois. Sabien, originally a drummer, took up the violin to fill a gap in his local youth orchestra and developed his love for jazz after hearing the jazz violinist Stephane Grappelli. Sabien studied classical music at the University of Illinois combined with performing as a country/rock fiddler before enrolling at Berklee College of Music in 1977.  The following year, at age 21, he founded and chaired Berklee's Jazz Strings department. He left Berklee after three years to record and tour, eventually settling in Hayward, Wisconsin.

In the early 1980s he performed with and produced three albums for folk singer-songwriter, Jim Post and founded the Randy Sabien Jazz Quintet. He went on to provide violin, mandolin, guitar and piano accompaniment for many other American singer/songwriters as well as recording his own albums.  His first solo album with the Randy Sabien Jazz Quintet, In a Fog, was released in 1983 on Flying Fish Records, and later re-released on Fiddlehead Music, the label he founded in 1989. His most recent solo album Rhythm and Bows was released in late 2007. May 1980 marked the first of Sabien's several appearances over the next 25 years on Garrison Keillor's radio series A Prairie Home Companion where he played in the show's The Guy's All-Star Shoe Band. His concert with the Fiddlehead Band at the Grand Theater in Wausau, Wisconsin was broadcast on Wisconsin Public Television in 2012 as was a thirty-minute background feature, On the Road: Randy Sabien & Mike Dowling with Sabien and Dowling performing "Long Tall Mama" in an "impromptu acoustic jam".

Since the 1980s Sabien has combined performing and composing with conducting workshops for schools, music camps, and youth orchestras. His educational video and jazz clinic Jazz: What it is was released in 1990. He has also co-authored with Bob Philips, the text book and teachers' manual series Jazz Philharmonic: Making jazz easy in the string orchestra. (Alfred Publishing Co., 2000). In 2009 he was appointed chair of the Strings department of McNally Smith College of Music. He continues to perform both as a guest soloist and with his Fiddlehead Band.

Discography

Solo artist

1983 In a Fog, Flying Fish Records 
1989 Fiddlehead Blues, Fiddlehead Music
1991 The Sound of Fish Dreaming, Fiddlehead Music
1993 Paintin' the Canvas, Fiddlehead Music
1997 Live at the Cafe Carpe with Mike Dowling, Fiddlehead Music
2002  Segue with Brian Orff, Fiddlehead Music
2000s Cap a Cup of Dreams with Kevin McMullin, Fiddlehead Music
2004 Rock This House, Fiddlehead Music
2005 Randy Sabien Live, Quantum Leap Records
2008 Rhythm and Bows, Fiddlehead Music
2014 Soul of a Man, Fiddlehead Music
2017 Meet Me Under The Mistletoe, Fiddlehead Music

Guest artist
1979 Bela Fleck: Crossing The Tracks, Rounder Select
1981 Emery Christiansen: Between Planes, Mountain Railroad
1985  Greg Brown: In the Dark with You, Red House Records
1987 Jim Post:  Jim Post & Friends, Flying Fish
1988 Bela Fleck: Daybreak, Rounder Records
1990 Free Hot Lunch: Eat This, Flying Fish
1991  Jim Post: Learn Not To Burn,  National Fire Protection Music
1992  Jan Marra: These Crazy Years, Flying Fish
1996  Greg Brown:  Further In, Red House Records
1998 Peter Buffett: Wisconsin: An American Portrait,  Don't Records
2000  The Kate Wolf Anthology Weaver of Visions,  Rhino Records
2000  Mike Dowling: String Crazy, Wind River Records/Orchard
2000  Arthur & Friends: Arthur's Perfect Christmas,  Rounder Records
2001  Catfish Keith, Jitterbug Swing, Fish Tail Records/ Orchard
2001 Catfish Keith: Pepper in My Show, Fish Tall Records/ Orchard
2001  John Altenburgh: A Wisconsin Christmas, Orchard/Sony
2003 Greg Brown If I Had Known: Essential Recordings, 1980–96 Red House Records
2004 Jim Kansas: Jimmy and The Swingers  JK Records
2005  Corky Siegel's Traveling Chamber Blues Show!, Alligator Records
2007 Mick Sterling: Between Saturday Night and Sunday Morning, Calvin
2007  David Levin: Criminal, Day Eleven Records
2007  Randy Peterson: Picture Day!,  Randy Peterson Music
2007  Garrison Keillor: Dusty and Lefty: The Lives of the Cowboys, High Bridge Audio
2007  Ernie Hedrickson: Down The Road,  Ernie Hedrickson Music
2007  John Altenburgh: A Wisconsin Christmas "A Return To The Grand",  Altenburgh Records
2008  2007–2008 String and Full Orchestra, Alfred Music Publishing
2009  Peter Mulvey: Letters From a Flying Machine, Signature
2010  2009–2010 String and Full Orchestra, Alfred Music Publishing
2010  Music and The Creative Mind, FEMA Honors Orchestra, Mark Records
2012 Connie Evingson: Sweet Happy Life, Minnehaha Music
2012  Peter Mulvey: Good Stuff, CRS
2012  Kevin Bowe & The Okemah Prophets: Natchez Trace, Okemah Records
2013  Ian Callanan: In Beauty We Walk, GIA Publications
2013  Jack McNally: Take Time, Jack McNally Records

DVD
1986/2005 Randy Sabien Live in Minneapolis

References

External links

Randy Sabien: "Not Quite Like the Beatles", audio interview on WXPR
On the Road: Randy Sabien & Mike Dowling, video on PBS.org  

Randy Sabien, artist's page on SRO Artists

American jazz violinists
American male violinists
Berklee College of Music faculty
Berklee College of Music alumni
1956 births
Living people
Musicians from Wisconsin
People from Hayward, Wisconsin
People from Fort Bragg, North Carolina
Jazz musicians from North Carolina
21st-century American violinists
21st-century American male musicians
American male jazz musicians
Flying Fish Records artists